Sar Darreh or Sardarah or Sardareh or Sardarreh may refer to various places in Iran:
 Sardarreh, Ardabil
 Sardarah, Hormozgan
 Sar Darreh, Kermanshah
 Sar Darreh-ye Beyglar Beygi, Kermanshah Province
 Sar Darreh, Khuzestan
 Sar Darreh, Charam, Kohgiluyeh and Boyer-Ahmad Province
 Sar Darreh, Kohgiluyeh, Kohgiluyeh and Boyer-Ahmad Province
 Sar Darreh, Charusa, Kohgiluyeh and Boyer-Ahmad Province
 Sar Darreh, Kurdistan
 Sar Darreh, Lorestan
 Sar Darreh, West Azerbaijan